Tungsten nitride (W2N, WN, WN2) is an inorganic compound, a nitride of tungsten. It is a hard, solid, brown-colored ceramic material that is electrically conductive and decomposes in water.

It is used in microelectronics as a contact material, for conductive layers, and barrier layers between silicon and other metals, e.g. tungsten or copper. It is less commonly used than titanium nitride or tungsten films.

Tungsten nitride forms together with tungsten dioxide, tungsten trioxide, and tungsten pentoxide when an incandescent light bulb breaks while the filament is heated. 

Tungsten silicide is another material with similar use.

References 

Tungsten compounds
Nitrides
Ceramic materials